Abase may refer to:

Self-abasement
Amira Abase, Shamima Begum and Kadiza Sultana